Capella Cracoviensis is a period instrument ensemble and a chamber choir based in Kraków, Poland. It was formed in 1970 by composer and music conductor Stanisław Gałoński (b. 1936), its first director and general manager. Capella Cracoviensis specializes in early music, Renaissance polyphonies, Polish Baroque, and classical chamber music played on period instruments, as well as oratorios, and operatic scores including works of Mozart. Regular performances in many world-renowned venues have confirmed its status as one of the Poland's most outstanding period instrument ensembles.

Profile
Capella Cracoviensis (CC) has made numerous CD recordings over the years, most notably of the J. S. Bach Mass in B minor, W. A. Mozart Coronation Mass, and of Darius Milhaud's 6 chamber symphonies and 3 Opéras-Minutes. The group performed in many European countries including in the United States, Canada, Japan, South Korea and Taiwan, with the concert held for John Paul II at the Vatican on April 9, 2000, upon his return from the pilgrimage to Bethlehem.

The ensemble's performances feature instrumentalists and singers acclaimed in Poland and abroad. Its guest performers as well as concertmasters included Alessandro Moccia of the Orchestre des Champs-Élysées, Alberto Stevanin (Il Giardino Armonico, I Barocchisti of Ravenna, Ensemble Matheus), Fabio Ravasi (Europa Galante), Peter Hanson (Orchestre Revolutionnaire et Romantique); conductors Paul Goodwin, Andrew Parrott, Andreas Spering, Paul McCreesh, Roy Goodman, Fabio Bonizzoni, Matteo Messori and others. The orchestra works on projects with other early music companies such as Nachtmusique and Oltremontano.

In 1992 the company received two prestigious awards for their recordings of Milhaud: the French Diapason d'Or, and Grand Prix du Disque of the Académie Charles Cros. In 2008 a new director was appointed by the city, and a period of transition followed. The orchestra received nearly two million zlotys in new-project sponsorship money from the Polish Ministry of Culture in 2011, which is a record for music locally. The funds helped them launch the Verba et Voces festival of early music featuring international stars such as Kai Wessel. The CC produced grand oratorios by Handel (Theodora, Athalia, and Deborah), as well as Le nozze di Figaro by Mozart, along with a series of great Masses and Polish Baroque concerts across the region, which were free of charge.

Music director Jan Tomasz Adamus stirred considerable controversy in January 2011 when he requested that all of the CC instrumentalists switch from standard to period instruments, or leave the group if they did not. Eight senior members were dismissed, and organized a street-level protest backed by the union committee, but the changeover has proved beneficial for the company. The CC has experienced a music revival since it switched to old instruments, resulting in renewed interest among the general public and some enthusiastic reviews from the critics (Gazeta.pl; Wyborcza.pl).

Selected recordings

 2013 "Bach Rewrite" (Marcin Masecki, Piotr Orzechowski, conducted by Jan Tomasz Adamus). Decca

 2014 M.-A. Charpentier, Te Deum H.146, J.-B. Lully, Te Deum, Le Poème Harmonique & Capella Cracoviensis, conducted by Vincent Dumestre. Alpha
 2015 "Karłowicz – Serenada 1896". iteratio
 2015 J. S. Bach "Motets" (conducted by Fabio Bonizzoni). Alpha
 2016 G. B. Pergolesi "Adriano in Siria" (Franco Fagioli, Romina Basso, Juan Sancho, conducted by Jan Tomasz Adamus). Decca
 2017 "Chopin Schubert" (Mariusz Klimsiak, conducted by Jan Tomasz Adamus). Avi
 2018 N. Porpora "Germanico in Germania" (Max Emanuel Cenčić, Julia Lezhneva, Juan Sancho, conducted by Jan Tomasz Adamus). Decca
 2018 G. F. Händel "The Seven Deadly Sins" (Juan Sancho, conducted by Jan Tomasz Adamus). Enchiriadis
 2019 "Adam Jarzębski et consortes" (Agnieszka Świątkowska). iteratio
 2019 W. A. Mozart "Requiem" (conducted by Jan Tomasz Adamus). Capella Cracoviensis

See also 
Warsaw Philharmonic
Music of Poland

Notes and references

Culture in Kraków
Polish orchestras
Musical groups established in 1970
Polish choirs